The United Kingdom held a national preselection to choose the song that would go to the Eurovision Song Contest 1963. It was held on 24 February 1963 and presented by David Jacobs.

For a second year running Ronnie Caroll represented the UK with a song called "Say Wonderful Things" and went on to come 4th in the contest.

In addition to hosting the national final, David Jacobs provided the BBC TV commentary at the Eurovision final. Nicholas Parsons served as the jury spokesperson for the UK.

Before Eurovision

A Song for Europe 1963

At Eurovision
"Say Wonderful Things" won the national and went on to come 4th in the contest.

Voting

References

1963
Countries in the Eurovision Song Contest 1963
Eurovision
Eurovision